Anne Say (born  – died between 1484 and 1494) was an English Baroness through her marriage to Sir Henry Wentworth in   until her death. She was the daughter of Sir John Say (1441-1483) and his wife Elizabeth Cheney, Lady Say. She is notable for being the maternal grandmother to Jane Seymour, the third wife of King Henry VIII of England, making her the great-grandmother to Edward VI.

Early life and family
Anne Say was born  to Sir John Say and Elizabeth Cheney, Lady Say, the daughter of Sir Lawrence Cheney and his wife, Elizabeth Cockayne daughter of John Cokayne (died 1429) and Ida de Grey. Ida was a daughter of Welsh Marcher Lord Reginald Grey, 2nd Baron Grey de Ruthyn and Eleanor Le Strange of Blackmere. Through her mother, Ida was a direct descendant of Welsh Prince Gruffydd II ap Madog, Lord of Dinas Bran.
Anne's father, Sir John Say, represented Hertfordshire in several Parliaments from 1453 to 1478 and was chosen to serve as speaker from 1463 to 1465 and again 1467 to 1468. From 1455 to 1478, he held the post of  under-Treasurer of the Exchequer and from 1476 that of Keeper of the Great Wardrobe. Through her mother's first marriage to Sir Frederick Tilney, of Ashwellthorpe, Norfolk, and Boston, Lincolnshire, She was the half sister to Elizabeth Tilney. Both sisters would be the grandmothers to three of King Henry VIII's wives. Elizabeth being the grandmother to Anne Boleyn and her cousin,Catherine Howard, and Anne being the grandmother to Jane Seymour.

Anne had six other siblings. They were:
 Sir William Say (1452- 1529), of Baas (in Broxbourne), Bedwell (in Essendon), Bennington, Little Berkhampstead, and Sawbridgeworth, Hertfordshire, Lawford, Essex, Market Overton, Rutland, etc., Burgess (M.P.) for Plympton, Knight of the Shire for Hertfordshire, Sheriff of Somerset and Dorset, 1478–9, Sheriff of Essex and Hertfordshire, 1482–3, Justice of the Peace for Hertfordshire, 1486–1506, and, in right of his 1st wife, of East Lydford, Radstock, Spaxton, Wellesleigh, and Wheathill, Somerset, and, in right of his 2nd wife, of Wormingford Hall (in Wormingford), Essex, Great Munden, Hertfordshire, etc. He married (1st) before 18 November 1472 (date of letters of attorney) Genevieve Hill, daughter/heiress of John Hill, of Spaxton, Somerset. She was still alive in 1478. He married (2nd) shortly after 18 April 1480 Elizabeth Fray, widow of Sir Thomas Waldegrave, by whom he had two daughters, Mary Say and Elizabeth Say.  Mary, the eldest daughter married Henry Bourchier, 2nd Earl of Essex and 6th Baron Bourchier, by whom she had one daughter, Anne Bourchier, 7th Baroness Bourchier.
 Thomas Say, of Liston Hall, Essex.
 [Master] Leonard Say, clerk, Rector of Spaxton, Somerset. See Testamenta Eboracensia,   4 (Surtees Soc. 53) (1869): 86–88 (will of Leonard Say, clerk).
 Mary Say, married Sir Philip Calthorpe, Knt., by whom she had issue.
 Margaret Say, married Thomas Sampson, Esq.
 Katherine Say, married Thomas Bassingbourne.

Marriage and issue 
On about February 25 1470, Anne married Sir Henry Wentworth of Nettlestead, Suffolk, KB. He was the only son and heir of the courtier Sir Philip Wentworth (d. 18 May 1464) of Nettlestead, Suffolk, beheaded after the Battle of Hexham, and Mary Clifford, daughter of John Clifford, 7th Baron de Clifford, by Lady Elizabeth Percy, the daughter of Henry Percy. The couple had six children:
 
Sir Richard Wentworth, who married Anne Tyrrell, the daughter of Sir James Tyrrell, by whom he had three sons, Thomas Wentworth, 1st Baron Wentworth, Richard and Philip, and five daughters, Anne, Elizabeth, Margery, Dorothy and Thomasine.
Edward Wentworth.
Elizabeth Wentworth (died after 22 September 1545), who married firstly, Sir Roger Darcy (d. 30 September 1508) of Danbury, Essex. She was appointed to wait on Catherine of Aragon in October 1501. She was the mother of Thomas Darcy, 1st Baron Darcy of Chiche (1506 – 28 June 1558). She married secondly, as his second wife, Sir Thomas Wyndham (d. 1522) of Felbrigg, Norfolk, Vice-Admiral and councillor to Henry VIII, by whom she was the mother of Sir Thomas Wyndham. She married thirdly, as his third wife, John Bourchier, 1st Earl of Bath.
Margery Wentworth (c. 1478 – c. October 1550), who married, before 1500, Sir John Seymour, by whom she was the mother of Jane Seymour, third wife of Henry VIII and mother of Edward VI.
Dorothy Wentworth, who married, as his second wife, Sir Robert Broughton.
Jane Wentworth.

Death and burial
Anne's exact year of death remains a mystery. She was last mentioned in 1484, and her husband Henry Wentworth married his second wife Elizabeth Neville (d. September 1517) on October 22nd 1494. Therefore it is evident that she had died between 1484 and 1494.

Royal relatives and descendants

Ancestry

References

Works cited
 
 
 
 
 
 
 
 
 

1453 births
1484 deaths
1492 deaths
15th-century English nobility
15th-century English women
15th-century births
15th-century women
Baronesses
English baronesses
15th-century English people
Women of the Tudor period